Carlos Tomás Rodríguez-Pastor Persivale (born 11 April 1959) is a Peruvian billionaire businessman, and the owner of 71% of Intergroup Financial, a Peruvian banking and retail group. He is chairman and CEO of Intercorp, managing general partner of Nexus Group, and chairman of Interbank.

Early life
Carlos Rodriguez-Pastor was born in Peru on 11 April 1959. In 1968, after a coup, he fled with his family to Ecuador and later California. His father Carlos Rodriguez-Pastor Sr. was Peru's Minister of Economy from 1982 to 1984. In 1994, his father bought Banco Internacional del Peru, but died the following year.

He was educated at the Immaculate Heart College in Lima, Peru.

In 1983, he received a bachelor's degree from the University of California, Berkeley, and in 1988, an MBA from Tuck School of Business.

Career
From 1990–93, he was a vice-president at Citibank, New York, and from 1993–95, a managing director at Banco Santander, New York.

Since 1995, he has been chairman and CEO of Intercorp; managing general partner of Nexus Group; chairman of Interbank, and a director of Royalty Pharma, Casa Andina, Interseguro, Supermercados Peruanos, Inteligo Bank, InRetail, Innova Schools, and NG Restaurants.

Rodriguez-Pastor has stated he does not care for everyone to know how rich he is, saying: "I don't see what the big deal is".

In August 2011, Bloomberg considered him one of the 8 "hidden billionaires" in the world, until, in March 2012, Forbes magazine placed him on the list of the richest.2 That same year he founded InRetail, a holding company which manages supermarkets (Supermercados Peruanos), shopping centers (Real Plaza) and pharmacies (InkaFarma).

Personal life
He is married to Gabriela Perez Rocchietti, they have two children, and live mainly in New York City. He is the cousin of journalist Carlos Lozada.

See also
List of Peruvian billionaires by net worth

References

1959 births
Living people
People from Lima
Peruvian businesspeople
Peruvian billionaires